The 1997 Colgate Red Raiders football team was an American football team that represented Colgate University during the 1997 NCAA Division I-AA football season. Colgate won the Patriot League championship.

In its second season under head coach Dick Biddle, the team compiled a 7–5 record. Tim Girard, Blair Hicks and Dan Rivera were the team captains. 

The Red Raiders outscored opponents 414 to 300. Colgate was undefeated in league play to win its first conference championship. Because of the addition of Towson University to the league schedule, Colgate became the first Patriot League member to win six conference games in a year.

The team played its home games at Andy Kerr Stadium in Hamilton, New York.

Schedule

References

Colgate
Colgate Raiders football seasons
Patriot League football champion seasons
Colgate Red Raiders football